In gene-activated matrix technology (GAM), cytokines and growth factors could be delivered not as recombinant proteins but as plasmid genes. GAM is one of the tissue engineering approaches to wound healing.  Following gene delivery, the recombinant cytokine could be expressed in situ by endogenous would healing cells – in small amounts but for a prolonged period of time – leading to reproducible tissue regeneration.

References

External links
 Cardium Presents Gene Activated Matrix Technology And Update On Excellarate Clinical Development Program At ASGT Annual Meeting

Tissue engineering